Arrojadoa bahiensis is a species of plant in the family Cactaceae. It is endemic to Brazil.  Its natural habitat is rocky areas.

References

Cactoideae
Cacti of South America
Endemic flora of Brazil
Flora of Bahia
Vulnerable flora of South America
Taxonomy articles created by Polbot
Taxobox binomials not recognized by IUCN